Long Stratton High School is a secondary school located in the town of Long Stratton in the English county of Norfolk. It  educates children from ages 11 to 16 and has around 650 pupils at any one time. The school has a specialism in teaching Mathematics and ICT.

Description
The school was last fully inspected in 2012, and the inspectors found a smaller than-average secondary school which meets the expectations for attainment and progress. The students were almost exclusively white British: the proportion of students from minority ethnic groups is low all speak English as a first language. The proportion supported at school action is above average but the proportion of disabled students is below average, as is the number with statements of special educational need. Students behave well. Exclusions are very low and attendance is on an upward trend and is above average.

Curriculum
Virtually all maintained schools and academies follow the National Curriculum, and are inspected by Ofsted on how well they succeed in delivering a 'broad and balanced curriculum'.

The school teaches Key Stage 3 over three years.

Key Stage 3
Years 7-9 "enjoy a wide breadth of subjects. They develop as artists, designers and performers, as linguists, geographers and historians, as scientists and as sportsmen and women."

Key Stage 4
In Key Stage 4 , years 10 and 11, students principally study a range of GCSE courses so they achieve the English Baccalaureate. In order to do this, they study the core subjects of 
English, Maths, Science, they then have a guided choice, choosing two options from two option lists. They are guided to include a Modern Foreign Language and a humanity (History or Geography). Top sets can choose triple science.

Results
In September 2012 OFSTED rated the school as "good".

During the period 2011-13 the school enjoyed 3 consecutive years of record GCSE results with 84% of pupils achieving 5 or more A*-C GCSE grades. In 2014 these dropped to 71% of pupils achieving 5 or more A*-C GCSE grades - 66% of them including English and Maths.

Personnel matters
In September 2011 the then Headteacher, Dr. Paul Adams, was suspended for "gross misconduct over management issues". He was finally dismissed in September 2012 after losing his appeal over his suspension.

References

External links

Secondary schools in Norfolk
Academies in Norfolk
Long Stratton
Organizations established in 1949